Annual Review or Annual Reviews may refer to:

 An annual performance appraisal or performance review of an employee
 Annual Reviews (publisher), a publisher of academic journals
 The Annual Reviews series of journals, published by Annual Reviews (publisher), including:

Other scientific reports and journals not published by Annual Reviews
 Annual Review of Applied Linguistics, published by Cambridge University Press
 Annual Review of Banking Law, published by Boston University
 Annual Review of Cognitive Linguistics, published by John Benjamins for the Spanish Cognitive Linguistics Association
 Annual Reviews in Control, formerly known as Annual Review in Automatic Programming, published by Elsevier for the International Federation of Automatic Control
 Annual Review of Critical Psychology published by the Centre for Qualitative and Theoretical Research on the Reproduction and Transformation of Language, Subjectivity and Practice
 Annual Review of Gerontology and Geriatrics, published by Springer Publishing
 Annual Review of Heat Transfer, published by Begell House
 Annual Review of Islam in Africa, formerly known as Annual Review of Islam in South Africa, published by the University of Cape Town
 Annual Review of Jazz Studies, published by Transaction Books
 Annual Review of Migration Studies, published by the Japan Immigration Society
 Annual Review of Nursing Research, published by Springer Publishing
 Annual Review of Nano Research published by World Scientific
 Annual Review of Population Law published by the Harvard Law School
 Annual Review of Sex Research published by Routledge on behalf of the Society for the Scientific Study of Sexuality